Zocca is a comune (municipality) in the Province of Modena in the Italian region Emilia-Romagna, located about   southwest of Bologna and about  south of Modena.  

Zocca borders the following municipalities: Castel d'Aiano,  Guiglia, Montese, Pavullo nel Frignano, Valsamoggia, Vergato.

People
Maurizio Cheli, astronaut
Lorenzo Galluzzi, scientist
Vasco Rossi, singer-songwriter

References

External links
 Official website

Cities and towns in Emilia-Romagna